Edward Pollock (September 2, 1823 Philadelphia – December 13, 1858) was an American poet best known for writing "The Parting Hour" in 1857.

Life
He worked as a child in a cotton factory.  He apprenticed with a sign-painter.  In 1852, he moved to San Francisco, California, and became a contributor to the Pioneer magazine.  In 1856, he was admitted before the California Supreme Court.

Works

References

1823 births
1858 deaths
Writers from Philadelphia
19th-century American poets
American male poets
19th-century American male writers
Lawyers from Philadelphia
19th-century American lawyers